Thạch Hà is a rural district of Hà Tĩnh province in the North Central Coast region of Vietnam. As of 2003 the district had a population of 182,120. The district covers an area of 399 km². The district capital lies at Thạch Hà.

References

Districts of Hà Tĩnh province